Shaw Farm is a registered historic building near Ross, Ohio, listed in the National Register on 1974-07-24.

It includes the first stone house built in Butler County.

Historic uses 
Single Dwelling

Notes 

Farms on the National Register of Historic Places in Ohio
Buildings and structures in Butler County, Ohio
National Register of Historic Places in Butler County, Ohio